Slovak PATRIOT, originally founded in 2021 as the Real National Party – PATRIOT (abbreviation RNS – PATRIOT) is a Slovak political party. It was founded in 2021 by Miroslav Radačovský, MEP. Later, the party was renamed Slovak PATRIOT. The party was the only one registered in 2021 by collecting a sufficient number of signatures.

Party leadership 
The party's presidency has nine members:

 Miroslav Radačovský – Chairman
 Miroslav Jäger – vice-chairman
 Lívia Radačovská Adamová – vice-chairman
 Michal Radačovský – speaker

References

External links 

 Oficiálna webstránka strany RNS – PATRIOT
 RNS – PATRIOT v registri strán MV SR

Organizations established in 2021
Political parties established in 2021
Eurosceptic parties in Slovakia
Conservative parties in Slovakia
Nationalist parties in Slovakia
Green conservative parties